Meadows is a town in the Adelaide Hills, South Australia.  It boasts several historic buildings, craft shops, a winery and  bakery. Every year, the town hosts the Meadows Country Fair and Meadows Easter Fair. At the 2006 census, Meadows had a population of 752.

The land incorporating Meadows was part of the Seventh Special Survey undertaken by Charles Flaxman on 31 January 1839.

The 5000 hectare Kuitpo Forest, known for bushwalking, cycling, and horse riding, lies to the south, west and north of Meadows.  The nearby Prospect Hill Museum tells the story of the regional dairy industry and includes a re-created milk room.

History
The land including and surrounding Meadows is alternatively known as Battunga Country, Battunga being an official alternate name for Meadows.

Transport
Meadows is fairly close to Mount Barker and Hahndorf. It is serviced three times a day, once in the morning and twice in the afternoon by Adelaide Metro Route  to Aldgate, which connects to a city service .

On Tuesdays only, Meadows is also by serviced by 2 Southlink country services to Mt Barker. The  comes once in the morning and the  comes back in the afternoon once.

The routes 856 and 857 cannot be found on Adelaide Metros home page like the route 850 but can be found on Southlink's homepage along with the route  836 to Callington from Mt Barker.

Notes and references